Nungambakkam Railway Station is one of the railway stations of the Chennai Beach–Chengalpattu section of the Chennai Suburban Railway Network. It serves the neighbourhood of Nungambakkam, a suburb of Chennai. It is located at about 8 km from Chennai Beach terminus and is situated at Choolaimedu, with an elevation of 11 m above sea level.

History
Nungambakkam railway station was constructed when the electric suburban railway service was laid between 1928 and 1931. Before 1923, the stretch between Chetpet and Kodambakkam stations was covered by the Nungambakkam Tank. The section was converted to 25 kV AC traction on 15 January 1967.

Safety issues
Despite being one of the busier railway stations within downtown Chennai, the station lacked many safety factors, including lack of a closed-circuit television camera. The murder of Swathy, a 24-year-old computer engineer who was hacked to death by a then unidentified young man in the station premises on the morning of 24 June 2016 in full daylight, received wide media attention and publicity, leading to the public outcry on the safety levels at all suburban stations.

See also

 Chennai Suburban Railway
 Railway stations in Chennai

References

External links

 Nungambakkam railway station on IndiaRailInfo.com
 Local Train timings from/to Nungambakkam 

Stations of Chennai Suburban Railway
Railway stations in Chennai